Nectandra minima is a species of plant in the family Lauraceae. It is endemic to Cuba.  It is threatened by habitat loss.

References

minima
Endemic flora of Cuba
Critically endangered flora of North America
Taxonomy articles created by Polbot